Lolly (born Anna Shantha Kumble (pronounced KUUM-blay, Kŭmblā); 27 June 1977, Sutton Coldfield) is an English singer, dancer and TV presenter.

Career
Anna Kumble worked as a model before going into a pop career. Lolly arrived on the British pop music scene in 1999 with the release of her first single, "Viva La Radio". She released five singles and two albums over her two-year career in music. Her real name was released one letter at a time in Smash Hits magazine. After quitting her record label Polydor, Lolly reverted to her real name and began TV presenting, working for the BBC on programmes such as Xchange. She also works for Nickelodeon. Kumble also acted as a stand-in for presenter Anna Williamson some Saturday and Sunday mornings on now-axed kids show Toonattik on CITV. She has had roles in West End productions of Starlight Express at the Apollo Victoria Theatre and played Priscilla Presley in Elvis at the Prince of Wales Theatre. In July 2018, her first two albums "My First Album" and "Pick 'n' Mix" were released digitally. In October 2018, she released a new single "Stay Young and Beautiful", her first in 18 years. In 2020, Lolly's second single was titled Paper Rain.

Pantomime
Kumble has starred in a number of pantomimes, typically billed as "Anna Kumble (Lolly)." In 2002, she played Tinker Bell in Peter Pan at the Theatre Royal, Brighton. In 2004, she played the title role in Snow White and the Seven Dwarfs at the Derby Assembly Rooms. In 2006, Kumble starred as Alice Fitzwarren in Dick Whittington at The Playhouse in Weston-super-Mare. In 2009, Kumble again starred in Dick Whittington as Fairy Bowbells, this time at the Stag theatre, Kent.

In 2010, Kumble returned to Peter Pan, this time playing the role of Tiger Lily at the Lichfield Garrick Theatre. In December 2012, she appeared in Jack and the Beanstalk in Weymouth. In December 2018, she appeared in Cinderella as the Fairy Godmother in Telford. She returned to Telford in December 2022, where she appeared in Snow White as the Evil Queen.

Personal life
Anna Kumble was born to Jaiker Kumble (who emigrated from India) and Barbara in Sutton Coldfield. She has a brother Paul, and a sister Jodie. Kumble attended The Shrubbery School, Highclare School and Plantsbrook School in Sutton Coldfield. Kumble is a graduate of the London Studio Centre  and has two children, a son Charlie and a daughter Belle, who is following in her mother’s musical footsteps.

Discography

Albums

Singles

References

External links
Lolly biography, news and discography at Bubblegum Dancer
 
 Original Lolly Website

1977 births
Living people
Musicians from Birmingham, West Midlands
People from Sutton Coldfield
English women pop singers
English people of Indian descent
21st-century English women singers
21st-century English singers